Emeric from the kindred Csák (died after 1276) was a Hungarian lord in the 13th century, who served as ispán of Somogy County from 1272 to 1273.

Life and career
Emeric was born into an unidentified branch of the powerful and wealthy gens (clan) Csák, as the son of Stephen Csák and an unidentified granddaughter of the influential baron Pat Győr. His parents got married around 1228, consequently Emeric was born thereafter. His father Stephen was a confidant of Béla IV of Hungary since the 1220s and held several court dignities in the upcoming decades. Emeric had no known siblings nor descendants.

His father Stephen died sometime after 1269 or 1270. Emeric inherited his estates which mostly laid in Baranya County. After the minor Ladislaus IV ascended the Hungarian throne, Emeric was appointed ispán of Somogy County in September 1272. He held the office until 12 May 1273, when he was replaced by Mojs, a confidant of Queen Elizabeth the Cuman. Emeric sold his inherited estate Koromszó in Tolna County (present-day a borough of Máza in Baranya County) to the Kórógyi family in December 1276.

References

Sources 

 
 

13th-century Hungarian people
Emeric